Vishakha Raut is Shiv Sena Politician from Mumbai. She was the former Mayor of Brihanmumbai Municipal Corporation. 
She had also represented the Dadar Assembly Constituency from 1999 to 2004 in Maharashtra Legislative Assembly.

Positions held
 1997: Elected as corporator in Brihanmumbai Municipal Corporation 
 1997: Elected as Mayor of Brihanmumbai Municipal Corporation
 1999: Elected to Maharashtra Legislative Assembly
 2010 Onwards: Deputy Leader, Shiv Sena 
 2017: Re-elected as corporator in Brihanmumbai Municipal Corporation 
 2017: Elected as Chairman of Civil Works Committee Brihanmumbai Municipal Corporation 
 2018: Appointed as leader of the House in Brihanmumbai Municipal Corporation

References

External links
 ShivSena Home Page
 बृहन्मुंबई महानगरपालिका

Living people
Mayors of Mumbai
Marathi politicians
Shiv Sena politicians
Year of birth missing (living people)